The Cantonese people or Yue people, are a Yue-speaking Han Chinese subgroup originating from or residing in the provinces of Guangdong and Guangxi (collectively known as Liangguang), in Southern Mainland China. Although more accurately, "Cantonese" refers only to Han Chinese with roots from Guangzhou and its satellite cities and towns, rather than simply and generally referring to the people of the Liangguang region.

Historically centered and predominant in the Pearl River Basin shared between Guangdong and Guangxi, the Cantonese people are also responsible for establishing their native language's usage in Hong Kong and Macau during their 19th century migrations within the times of the British and Portuguese colonial eras respectively. Cantonese remains today as a majority language in Guangdong and Guangxi, despite the increasing influence of Mandarin. Taishanese people may also be considered Cantonese but speak a distinct variety of Yue Chinese, Taishanese.

Terminology
"Cantonese" has been generally used to describe all Chinese people from Guangdong since "Cantonese" is commonly treated as a synonym with "Guangdong" and the Cantonese language is treated as the sole language of the region. This is inaccurate as "Canton" itself technically only refers to Guangdong's capital Guangzhou and the Cantonese language specifically refers to only the Guangzhou dialect of the Yue Chinese languages. David Faure points out that there is no direct Chinese translation of the English term "Cantonese".

Although it originally and chiefly applied to the walled city of Guangzhou, it was occasionally conflated with Guangdong by some authors. Within Guangdong and Guangxi, Cantonese is considered the prestige dialect and is called baahk wá,  which means "vernacular". In historical times, it was known as "Guangzhou speech" or Guangzhounese (廣州話, 广州话, Gwóngjāu wá).

Other Yue peoples are sometimes labelled as "Cantonese" such as the Taishanese people, even though Taishanese has low intelligibility to Standard Cantonese. Some literature uses neutral terminology such as Guangdongese and Guangxiese to refer to people from these provinces without the cultural or linguistic affiliations to Cantonese.

History

Pre-19th century: History of Liangguang

Until the 19th century, Cantonese history was largely the history of Guangdong and Guangxi provinces. What is now Guangdong and later Guangxi, was first brought under Qin influence by a general named Zhao Tuo, who later founded the kingdom of Nanyue in 204 BC. The Nanyue kingdom went on to become the strongest Baiyue state, with many neighbouring kingdoms declaring their allegiance to Nanyue rule. Zhao Tuo took the Han territory of Hunan and defeated the Han dynasty's first attack on Nanyue, later annexing the kingdom of Minyue in the east and conquering Âu Lạc, Northern Vietnam, in the west in 179 BC.

The greatly expanded Nanyue kingdom included the territories of modern-day Guangdong, Guangxi and Northern Vietnam (Tonkin), with the capital situated at modern-day Guangzhou. The native peoples of Liangguang remained under Baiyue control until the Han dynasty in 111 BC, following the Han–Nanyue War. However, it was not until subsequent dynasties such as the Jin dynasty, the Tang dynasty and the Song dynasty that major waves of Han Chinese began to migrate south into Guangdong and Guangxi. Waves of migration and subsequent intermarriage meant that existing populations of both provinces were displaced, but some native groups like the Zhuangs still remained. The Cantonese often call themselves "people of Tang". This is because of the inter-mixture between native and Han immigrants in Guangdong and Guangxi reached a critical mass of acculturation during the Tang dynasty, creating a new local identity among the Liangguang peoples.

During the 4th–12th centuries, Han Chinese people from the central plains migrated and settled in the South of China. This gave rise to peoples including the Cantonese themselves and other dialect groups of Guangdong during the Tang dynasty. There have been multiple migrations of Han people into Southeastern and Southern China throughout history.

The origin of the Cantonese people is thus said to be Northern Chinese peoples that migrated to Guangdong and Guangxi while it was still inhabited by Baiyue peoples. During Wang Mang's reign in the Han dynasty (206BC–220AD), there were influxes of Han Chinese migrants into Guangdong and Guangxi, western coast of Hainan, Annam (now Northern Vietnam) and Eastern Yunnan.

19th–20th century: Turmoil and migration

During the early 1800s, conflict occurred between Cantonese and Portuguese pirates in the form of the Ningpo massacre after the defeat of Portuguese pirates. The First (18391842) and Second Opium Wars (18561860) led to the loss of China's control over Hong Kong and Kowloon, which were ceded to the British Empire. Macau also became a Portuguese settlement. Between 1855 and 1867, the Punti–Hakka Clan Wars caused further discord in Guangdong and Guangxi. The third plague pandemic of 1855 broke out in Yunnan and spread to the Liangguang region via Guangxi, killing thousands and spreading via water traffic to nearby Hong Kong and Macau.

The turmoil of the 19th century, followed by the political upheaval of the early 20th century, compelled many residents of Guangdong to migrate overseas in search of a better future. Up until the second half of the 20th century, the majority of overseas Chinese emigrated from two provinces of China; Guangdong and Fujian. As a result, there are today many Cantonese communities throughout the world, including in Southeast Asia, the Pacific Islands, the Americas, the Caribbean and Western Europe, with Chinatowns commonly being established by Cantonese communities. There have been a large number of interracial marriages between Cantonese men and women from other nations (especially from Cuba, Peru, Mexico), as most of the Cantonese migrants were men. As a result, there are many Afro-Caribbeans and South American people of Cantonese descent including many Eurasians.

Unlike the migrants from Fujian, who mostly settled in Southeast Asia, many Cantonese emigrants also migrated to the Western Hemisphere, particularly the United States, Canada, Australia and New Zealand. Many Cantonese immigrants into the United States became railroad labourers, while many in South America were brought in as coolies. Cantonese immigrants in the United States and Australia participated in the California Gold Rush and the Australian gold rushes of 1854 onwards, while those in Hawaii found employment in sugarcane plantations as contract labourers. These early immigrants variously faced hostility and a variety of discriminatory laws, including the prohibition of Chinese female immigrants. The relaxation of immigration laws after World War II allowed for subsequent waves of migration to the Western world from Southeastern Mainland China, Hong Kong and Macau. As a result, Cantonese continues to be widely used by Chinese communities of Guangdong, Guangxi, Hong Kong and Macau regional origin in the Western hemisphere, and has not been supplanted by the Mandarin-based Standard Chinese. A large proportion of the early migrants also came from the Siyi region of Guangdong and spoke Taishanese. The Taishanese variant is still spoken in American Chinese communities, by the older population as well as by more recent immigrants from Taishan, in Jiangmen, Guangdong.

Cantonese influence on Xinhai Revolution
Cantonese uprising against feudal China in 1895 let to its naming as the "cradle of the Xinhai Revolution". Revolutionary leader Sun Yat-sen was born in Zhongshan, Guangdong. Hong Kong was where he developed his thoughts of revolution and was the base of subsequent uprisings, as well as the first revolutionary newspaper. Sun Yat-sen's revolutionary army was largely made up of Cantonese, and many of the early revolutionary leaders were also Cantonese.

Cultural hub

Cantonese people and their culture are centered in Guangdong, Eastern Guangxi, Hong Kong and Macau.

Guangzhou (formerly known as Canton), the capital city of Guangdong, has been one of China's international trading ports since the Tang dynasty. During the 18th century, it became an important centre of the emerging trade between China and the Western world, as part of the Canton System. The privilege during this period made Guangzhou one of the top three cities in the world. Operating from the Thirteen Factories located on the banks of the Pearl River outside Canton, merchants traded goods such as silk, porcelain ("fine china") and tea, allowing Guangzhou to become a prosperous city. Links to overseas contacts and beneficial tax reforms in the 1990s have also contributed to the city's ongoing growth. Guangzhou was named a global city in 2008. The migrant population from other provinces of China in Guangzhou was 40 percent of the city's total population in 2008. Most of them are rural migrants and they speak only standard Chinese.

Hong Kong and Macau are two of the richest cities in the world in terms of GDP per capita and are autonomous SARs (Special Administrative Regions) that are under independent governance from China. Historically governed by the British and Portuguese empires respectively, colonial Hong Kong and Macau were increasingly populated by migrant influxes from mainland China, particularly the nearby Guangdong Province. For that reason, the culture of Hong Kong and Macau became a mixture of Cantonese and Western influences, sometimes described as "East meets West".

Hong Kong

Hong Kong Island was first colonised by the British Empire in 1842 with a population of only 7,450; however, it was in 1898 that Hong Kong truly became a British colony, when the British also colonised the New Territories (which constitute 86.2% of Hong Kong's modern territory). It was during this period that migrants from China entered, mainly speaking Cantonese (the prestige variety of Yue Chinese) as a common language. During the following century of British rule, Hong Kong grew into a hub of Cantonese culture and has remained as such since the handover in 1997.

Today Hong Kong is one of the world's leading financial centres and the Hong Kong dollar is the thirteenth most-traded currency in the world.

Macau
Macau native people are known as the Tanka. A dialect similar to Shiqi, originating from Zhongshan in Guangdong, is also spoken in the region.

Parts of Macau were first loaned to the Portuguese by China as a trading centre in the 16th century, with the Portuguese required to administrate the city under Chinese authority. In 1851 and 1864, the Portuguese Empire occupied the two nearest offshore islands Taipa and Coloane respectively and Macau officially became a colony of the Portuguese Empire in 1887. Macau was returned to China in 1999.

By 2002, Macau had become one of the world's richest cities and by 2006, it had surpassed Las Vegas to become the world's biggest gambling centre. Macau is also a world cultural heritage site due to its Portuguese colonial architecture.

Culture

The term "Cantonese" is used to refer to the native culture, language and people of Guangdong and Guangxi.

There are cultural, economic, political, generational and geographical differences in making "Cantonese-ness" in and beyond Guangdong and Guangxi, with the interacting dynamics of migration, education, social developments and cultural representations.

Language
The term "Cantonese language" is sometimes used to refer to the broader group of Yue Chinese languages and dialects spoken in Guangdong and Guangxi, although it is used more specifically to describe Gwóngjāu wah, the prestige variant of Cantonese spoken in the city of Guangzhou (historically known as Canton). Gwóngjāu wah is the main language used for education, literature and media in Hong Kong and Macau. It is still widely used in Guangzhou, despite the fact that a large proportion of the city's population is made up by migrant workers from elsewhere in China that speak non-Cantonese variants of Chinese and Standard Mandarin. Though in recent years it is slowly falling out of favour with the younger generation  prompting fears in Cantonese people that the language may die out. Cantonese language's erosion in Guangzhou is due to a mix of suppression of the language and the mass migration of non-Cantonese speaking people in to the area.

Because of its tradition of usage in music, cinema, literature and newspapers, this form of Cantonese is a cultural mark of identity that distinguishes Cantonese people from speakers of other varieties of Chinese, whose languages are prohibited to have strong influences under China's Standard Mandarin policy. The pronunciation and vocabulary of Cantonese has preserved many features of the official language of the Tang dynasty with elements of the ancient Yue language. Written Cantonese is very common in manhua, books, articles, magazines, newspapers, online chat, instant messaging, internet blogs and social networking websites. Anime, cartoons and foreign films are also dubbed in Cantonese. Some videogames such as Sleeping Dogs, Far Cry 4, Grand Theft Auto III and Resident Evil 6 have substantial Cantonese dialogues.

Arts

Cantopop during its early glory had spread to Mainland China, Taiwan, Japan, Singapore, Malaysia and Indonesia. Well-known Cantopop singers include Andy Lau, Aaron Kwok, Joey Yung, Alan Tam, Roman Tam, Anita Mui, Danny Chan, Leslie Cheung, Jacky Cheung, Leon Lai, Sammi Cheng and Coco Lee, many of whom are of Cantonese or Taishanese origin.

The Hong Kong movie industry was the third-largest movie industry in the world (after Hollywood and Bollywood) for decades throughout the 20th century, with Cantonese-language films viewed and acclaimed around the world. Recent films include Kung Fu Hustle, Infernal Affairs and Ip Man 3.

Cantonese people are also known to create various schools or styles of arts, with the more prominent being Lingnan architecture, Lingnan school of painting, Canton porcelain, Cantonese opera, Cantonese music, among many others.

Cuisine

Cantonese cuisine has become one of the most renowned types of cuisine around the world, characterised by its variety of cooking methods and use of fresh ingredients, particularly seafood. One of the most famous examples of Cantonese cuisine is dim sum, a variety of small and light dishes such as har gow (steamed shrimp dumplings), siu mai (steamed pork dumplings) and cha siu bao (barbecued pork buns).

Genetics
According to research, Cantonese peoples' paternal lineage is mostly Han, while their maternal lineage is mostly Nanyue aboriginals. Speakers of Pinghua and Tanka, however, lack Han ancestry and are "truly, mostly pureblood Baiyue". These genetic differences have contributed to Cantonese differing from other Han Chinese groups in terms of physical appearance and proneness to certain diseases. The genetic admixture of the Cantonese people clusters somewhere between the Zhuang people (Tai) and the Northern Plains Han Chinese people.

Notable figures

This is an incomplete list of notable Cantonese people.

Historical
 Liu Yan, king of Nanhai and first emperor of the Yue/Han kingdom between 917 and 971
 Liang Daoming, king of Palembang during the Ming dynasty.
 Chow Ah Chi, a Toisan Cantonese was Sir Stamford Raffles' ship carpenter who was the first man to land on modern-day Singapore and led the way in posting the East India Company's flag on Singapore Island. 
 Ching Shih, a female pirate leader brothel owner
 Cheng I, pirate and husband of Ching Shih
 Ah Pak, pirate chieftain who defeated Portuguese pirates
 Liu Chang, the last emperor of the Southern Han Kingdom
 Yuan Chonghuan, a Chinese general and hero from Ming dynasty who defeated and ward off the Manchu invasion

 Sun Yat-sen, born in Zhongshan, Guangdong; Chinese revolutionary and founder of the Republic of China
 Deng Shichang, admiral and one of the first modern naval officers in China in the late Qing dynasty
 Tse Tsan-tai, early Chinese revolutionary of the late Qing dynasty
 Kang Youwei was a Chinese scholar, noted calligrapher and prominent political thinker and reformer of the late Qing dynasty.
 Liang Qichao was a Chinese scholar, journalist, philosopher and reformist who lived during the Qing dynasty and Republic of China.
 Henry Lee Hau Shik, first Finance Minister of the Federation of Malaya and the only major leader of the independence movement not born in Malaya.
 Jiang Guangnai, general and statesman in the Republic of China and the People's Republic of China who successfully defended Shanghai City from the Japanese invasion in the 28 January Incident of 1932

Entertainers
 Anna May Wong, the first Chinese American and Asian female international movie star
 Anita Mui, singer and actress, dubbed as the "Madonna of the East".
 Harry Shum Jr., actor
 James Wong Howe, leading Hollywood cinematographer in the 1930s–40s and ten-time Academy Award nominee
 Lai Man-Wai, the father of Hong Kong cinema
 Stephen Chow, His mother is Cantonese but his grandfather is from Ningbo. He is actor and film director known for the comedy blockbusters Shaolin Soccer and Kung Fu Hustle.
 John Woo, influential film director
 Tony Leung Chiu-wai, award-winning actor known for his collaborations with Wong Kar-wai, including In The Mood For Love
 Andy Lau, one of Hong Kong's most commercially successful singers and actors since the mid-1980s
 Gigi Lai, actress and Cantopop singer
 Aaron Kwok, dancer and singer since the early 1990s
 Amy Kwok, actress and Miss Hong Kong 1991
 Eason Chan, well-known Cantopop singer
 Rainie Yang, Taiwanese singer
 Vivian Chow, Cantopop singer and actress
 Fish Leong, Malaysian Chinese singer
 Kris Wu, Chinese Canadian actor and singer, former member of K-pop boy band EXO.
 Jackson Wang, singer and member of K-pop boy band GOT7.
 Louis Koo, Hong Kong actor
 Tony Leung Ka-fai, Hong Kong actor
 Cheung Ka Fai, Hong Kong actor
 Leo Ku, Hong Kong singer
 Rui En, famous Singaporean actress
 Liang Wern Fook, one of the pioneer figures in Singaporean Chinese folk songs
 Yuen Woo-ping, renowned as one of the most successful and influential figures in the world of Hong Kong action cinema
 Sinn Sing Hoi, one of the earliest generation of Chinese composers 
 Chris Cheong, an international mentalist and illusionist. 
 Terence Cao, Singaporean actor
 Mark Chen, renowned Singaporean composer
 Kelly Poon, Singaporean singer
 Awkwafina, American rapper, comedian, television personality, television host
 Jeff Chan, Asian American tenor saxophonist and composer
 Zen Chong, Malaysian actor and won supporting acting in 2009
 Michael Paul Chan is an American film and television actor.
 Laura Ling, American journalist and writer. Correspondent and vice-president of its Vanguard Journalism Unit.
 Lisa Ling, American journalist, television presenter, special correspondent for The Oprah Winfrey Show
 Sam Tsui, American singer/songwriter and video producer. Internet celebrity with 2.8 million subscribers on YouTube.
 Wong brothers, three ethnic Chinese film directors, the pioneers of the Indonesian movie industry
 Lo Lieh, famous Hong Kong action star
 Lü Wencheng, master of Cantonese music and Guangdong folk music
 Warren Mok, an operatic tenor who has performed many leading roles since his European debut in 1987.
 Hung Sin Nui, Master of Chinese and Cantonese opera.
 Jeff Fatt, Australian musician and actor.

Politicians
 Tang Shaoyi, Prime Minister of the Republic of China
 Donald Tsang, Chief Executive of Hong Kong
 Edmund Ho Hau Wah, Chief Executive of Macau
 Fernando Chui, Chief Executive of Macau
 Wu Ting-fang, Chinese foreign minister
 Wen Tsungyao, Chinese politician and diplomat
 Kang Tongbi Chinese politician.
 Hiram Fong, the first Asian American and Chinese to be elected as Republican United States Senator and nominated for presidency of the United States
 John So, the first Lord Mayor of Melbourne to be directly elected by the people in 2006 and the first mayor of Asian descent
 Adrienne Clarkson, 26th Governor General of Canada, the first non-white Canadian to be appointed to the vice-regal position
 Norman Kwong, the 16th Lieutenant Governor of Alberta, Canada
 Gary Locke, first governor of a state in the Continental United States of Asian descent; the only Chinese American ever to serve as a governor
 Judy Chu, first Chinese American woman to be elected to the United States Congress
 Julius Chan, Prime Minister of Papua New Guinea from 1980 to 1982 and from 1994 to 1997
 Lee Siew Choh, politician and medical doctor. Singapore's first Non-Constituency Member of Parliament (NCMP)
 Tan Sri Datuk Amar Stephen Kalong Ningkan was the first Chief Minister of Sarawak.
 Víctor Joy Way was the Prime Minister of Peru from January 1999 until December 1999. 
 José Antonio Chang Escobedo was the Prime Minister of Peru and second Chinese Peruvian Prime Minister, the first being Víctor Joy Way
 Peter Chin, lawyer and 56th Dunedin, New Zealand mayor
 Meng Foon, mayor of Gisborne, New Zealand
 Alan Lowe, architect, former mayor of Victoria, British Columbia, Canada
 Ida Chong, accountant, former municipal councillor of Saanich, British Columbia, former cabinet minister/Member of Legislative Assembly of British Columbia, Canada
 Chang Apana, inspirational detective with an influential law enforcement career
 Kin W. Moy American diplomat and the first ethnic Chinese to be director of the American Institute in Taiwan.
 Debra Wong Yang, first Asian American woman to serve as a United States Attorney.
 Chan Heng Chee, Singapore's Minister in Prime Minister's Office, Chief of Army from 2010 to 2011
 Chan Sek Keong, third Chief Justice of Singapore, Attorney-General of Singapore from 1992 to 2006
 Chan Kong Choy, Malaysian politician, deputy president and transport minister
 Cheryl Chan, member of the country's governing People's Action Party (PAP)
 Sitoh Yih Pin, Singapore politician member of Parliament (MP)
 Leong Yew Koh, first Governor of Malacca since independence.
 Cheong Yoke Choy, famous and well respected philanthropist during the British Malaya era. 
 Edwin Tong, member of Parliament in Singapore representing the Marine Parade Group Representation Constituency.
 Eu Chooi Yip, prominent member of the anti-colonial and Communist movements in Malaya and Singapore 
 Ho Peng Kee, Senior Minister of State in the Ministry of Law and the Ministry of Home Affairs
 Jek Yeun Thong, prominent first generation People's Action Party (PAP) politician in Singapore
 Hoo Ah Kay, leader with many high ranking posts in Singapore, honourable consul to China, Japan and Russia.
 Kan Ting Chiu, Senior Judge in the Supreme Court. 
 Ho Yuen Hoe, Nun who received a Public Service Award from the President of Singapore
 Kin W. Moy, American diplomat. He is one of the first Chinese to hold an important position.
 Datuk Patinggi Tan Sri Dr. George Chan Hong Nam, was the former Deputy Chief Minister of Sarawak. 
 Fong Chan Onn, Malaysian politician and a former Minister of Human Resources
 Fong Po Kuan, Malaysian politician from the Democratic Action Party (DAP)
 Loke Siew Fook,  Member of the Parliament of Malaysia 
 Tan Chee Khoon, major figure in Malaysian politics from 1959 to 1978
 Lui Tuck Yew, country's Minister for Transport and Second Minister for Defence, Singapore's Chief of Navy from 1999 to 2003
 António Ng Kuok Cheong is currently a member in the Macau Legislative Assembly and was the founding chairman of the New Democratic Macau Association.

Athletes
 Chen Aisen, Chinese diver. He is a double gold medal winner at the 2016 Summer Olympics and a world champion.
 Wong Peng Soon, a renowned male badminton player in the latter half of the 20th century
 Patrick Chan, a world champion Chinese Canadian male figure skater
 Michelle Kwan, Chinese American female figure skater and five-time world champion
 Yi Jianlian, a 7-foot-tall Chinese basketball player for NBA, Milwaukee Bucks, New Jersey Nets and Washington Wizards
 Guan Weizhen, female badminton player who won three consecutive women's doubles titles at the BWF World Championships
 Chen Xiaomin, Chinese retired weightlifter, in 2000 Sydney Olympics on the women's weightlifting gold medal, also a world and Asian champion
 Shanshan Feng, the first golfer from China to win LPGA major championship and major championship, she was ranked fifth in 2012 Women's World Golf Rankings.
 He Chong, Chinese diver. He is the 2008 Olympic Champion gold medalist in the 3m springboard. He was unbeaten from 2006 to 2016.
 Jiang Jialiang, table tennis player. He won medals in Asia and world table tennis tournaments.
 Xie Xingfang, badminton player, a two-time world champion women's singles.
 Chen Xiexia, won three golds at the 2007 World Weightlifting Championships. The first gold medal for China in the 2008 Summer Olympics.
 Zhang Jiewen, gold medal in Badminton 2004 Athens
 Lao Lishi, gold medal in women's 10 meter synchronised platform along with Li Ting.
 Su Bingtian, sprinter. He is the reigning Asian champion over 100 metres, was a semi-finalist at the 2012 Summer Olympics and a finalist at the 2015 World Championships.
 Liang Wenchong, highest ranked golfer from the People's Republic of China, the only Chinese golfer to have reached the top 100 of the Official World Golf Ranking.
 Zeng Qiliang, the first medal of Chinese male swimmer in world championships.
 Lindswell Kwok, six times world champion of Wushi
 Brian Ah Yat, former American football quarterback
 Harland Ah You, is a former gridiron football defensive lineman who played 10 games with the Calgary Stampeders of the Canadian Football League in 1998. 
 Junior Ah You, Hall of Fame and Top 50 players of the league's modern era by Canadian sports network TSN.
 Keanu Asing, surfer who competes in the World Surf League and debuted on the World Championship Tour of the 2015 World Surf League.
 Soh Wooi Yik, Malaysian men's doubles player in badminton, first Malaysians to win BWF World Championships in 2022.
 Josiah Ng, the first Malaysian to make it into the cycling Olympic finals becoming a three-time Olympian
 Brian Fok, footballer
 Leung Ka Hai, footballer
 Zhi-Gin Lam

Business
 Raymond, Thomas and Walter Kwok, Brothers whose property business makes them the fourth richest in Hong Kong
 Stanley Ho, Hong Kong and Macanese business magnate
 Lui Che-woo, real estate and hospitality magnate, Hong Kong billionaire, once the 2nd richest man in Asia
 Cheng Yu-tung, Hong Kong billionaire
 Tang Yiu Hong Kong billionaire businessman, founder of shoe and sportswear retailer Belle International
 Mei Quong Tart, rich nineteenth-century merchant
 Yaw Teck Seng was founded of Sarawak timber group, Samling
 Charles Sew Hoy, merchant and gold-dredging pioneer
 Loke Yew, philanthropist and was once the richest man in British Malaysia
 Chin Gee Hee, merchant and railway entrepreneur
 Lee Shau-kee, Once the 4th richest man in world, real estate tycoon and owner of Henderson Land Development
 Steven Lo, businessman and football team manager
 He Jingtang, a prominent Chinese architect for Olympic 2008
 Jimmy Lai, founder of Giordano
 Ho Ching, First Lady of Singapore
 He Xiangjian is the co-founder of Midea, one of China's largest appliance makers.
 Yang Huiyan, the majority shareholder of Country Garden Holdings
 Lawrence Ho, Hong Kong businessman, chairman and CEO of Melco International, the chairman and CEO of Melco Crown Entertainment
 Dennis Fong, Fong is recognised by the Guinness Book of World Records as the first professional gamer.
 Peter Tham, former Singaporean stockbroker and the director of Pan-Electric Industries and now a wanted criminal.
 Loke Wan Tho, founder of Cathay Organisation in Singapore and Malaysia.
 Datuk Seri Panglima Dr Wong Kwok, founder of the Wong Kwok Group in Sabah, Malaysia.
 Eu Tong Sen, leading businessman in Malaya, Singapore and Hong Kong during the late 19th and early 20th century
 Ah Ken, Chinese American businessman and popular figure in Chinatown, Manhattan during the mid-to late 19th century.
 Kathy Chan, Chinese American entrepreneur and investor
 Wesley Chan, early product innovator at Google Inc., best known for founding and launching Google Analytics and Google Voice

Arts and Photography
 Chen Yongqiang, is a China as a national level A artist and vice-president of the Chinese Painting Society.
 Choy Weng Yang, contributions on post-modern arts in Singapore, helped shaped the contemporary art scene in Singapore
 Reagan Louie, an American photographer on sex life.
 Alan Chin, contributing photographer to Newsweek and The New York Times, editor and photographer at BagNews
 Bernice Bing, Chinese American lesbian artist involved in the San Francisco Bay Area art scene in the 1960s
 Lee Man Fong, A painter who had successful exhibitions in Europe and Asia.
 You Jin, received the Cultural Medallion Award in 2009 for her contributions to Singapore's literary arts scene.

Martial artists
 Ip Man, martial artist and teacher of Bruce Lee.
 Wong Fei-hung, martial artist in the Qing dynasty.
 Donnie Yen, martial artist and actor, one of Asia's highest paid action stars.
 Bruce Lee, one of the most influential martial artists and famous actors of Asian descent of all time.
 Chan Heung, founder of Choy Li Fut

Authors
 Francis Chan, American Christian teacher, preacher, author of the best-selling book Crazy Love: Overwhelmed by a Relentless God
 Clara Ng, Indonesian writer who is known for both adult fiction and children's literature.
 Amy Tan, Award-winning Chinese American author of The Joy Luck Club and other best-selling books
 Jeffery Paul Chan, American author and scholar

Academics
 Flossie Wong-Staal, a virologist and molecular biologist; the first scientist to clone HIV and determine the function of its genes in 1985. In 2007 The Daily Telegraph heralded Dr. Wong-Staal as #32 of the "Top 100 Living Geniuses".
 Chu Ching-wu, physicist and one of the first scientists to demonstrate high-temperature superconductivity, in 1987
 Choh Hao Li, Chinese American biochemist and first scientist to synthesise human growth hormone in 1970
 Tak Mak, Chinese Canadian immunologist and biochemist, discovered T-cell receptor. 
 Wu Ta-You, the "father of Chinese physics"
 Wu Lien-teh, physician and Nobel prize nominee
 Vivian Wing-Wah Yam, chemist known for her work on light-emitting materials and solar energy
 Albert Chan, professor of chemistry and traditional Chinese medicine
 Liang Sili, rocket and missile control system scientist
 Nancy Ip – member of the Chinese Academy of Sciences and the World Academy of Sciences
 Albert Chan – a Hong Kong professor of chemistry and traditional Chinese medicine.
 Liang Sili – Chief Designer of inertial guidance platforms for Chinese ballistic missiles.
 Li Shaozhen – improve cataract surgery quality in the introduction of technology and innovation

Mathematician
 Yum-Tong Siu – the William Elwood Byerly Professor of Mathematics at Harvard University

Other notable figures
 Feng Joe Guey, Chinese aviation pioneer
 Liang Sicheng, the "father of modern Chinese architecture"
 Dai Ailian, the "mother of Chinese modern dance"
 Lee Ya-Ching, pioneering aviator and actress
 Chang Apana A famous detective who influenced many fictional works.
 Ye Xiaogang, China's most active and most famous composers of contemporary classical music.
 Tunku Azizah Aminah Maimunah Iskandariah

See also
 Cantonese culture
 Cantonese language
 Chinese people
 Taishanese language

References

Further reading
 

 
Cantonese culture
Guangdong
Guangxi